"Hungry for Love" is a song by Bad Boys Blue. It was the only new track on their 1989 greatest-hits album Bad Boys Best and was released as its lead single, debuting at number 26 in West Germany for the week of January 30, 1989. It was also the last single from the group to feature ex-vocalist Trevor Taylor (singer), who has left the previous year.

Background 
In 1988, Trevor Taylor left the group a year after being gradually demoted from his role of the lead singer. He was asked to rejoin the group the following year just for recording sessions for the "Hungry for Love" single that was to be featured on the group's first compilation album Bad Boys Best.

After Trevor Taylor's departure the vocalist position was permanently secured by John McInerney.

Composition 
The song was written by Tony Hendrik and Karin Hartmann (as Karin van Haaren) and produced by Hendrik and Hartmann.

Charts

References 

1989 songs
1989 singles
Bad Boys Blue songs
Songs written by Tony Hendrik